Tyler Reed and similar names may refer to:

 Tyler Reed,  American football player
 Tyler Reed (swimmer), American swimmer
 Tyler Read,  Southern rock band
 Tyler Read (actor), actor in New Zealand soap Shortland Street
 S. Tyler Read, American army officer and general after the American Civil War
 Tyler Reid,  English football player